Encirclement campaigns, officially called in Chinese Communist historiography as the Agrarian Revolutionary War were the campaigns launched by forces of the Chinese Nationalist Government against forces of the Chinese Communist Party during the early stage of the Chinese Civil War.

Formulated by German advisors Hans von Seeckt and Alexander von Falkenhausen, the campaigns were launched between the late 1920s to the mid-1930s with the goal of isolating and destroying the developing Chinese Red Army.  The Nationalist forces launched encirclement campaigns against Communist bases in several separate locations across China.

Encirclement campaigns by location
Encirclement campaign against the Eastern Fujian Soviet
Encirclement campaign against the Hunan-Hubei-Jiangxi Soviet
Encirclement campaign against the Hunan-Hubei-Sichuan-Guizhou Soviet
Encirclement campaign against the Hunan-Jiangxi Soviet
Encirclement campaign against the Hunan-Western Hubei Soviet
Encirclement campaign against the Northeastern Jiangxi Soviet
Encirclement campaign against the Yunnan-Guizhou-Guangxi Soviet
Encirclement campaign against the Zuojiang Soviet

First encirclement campaigns
First encirclement campaign against the Central Fujian Soviet
First encirclement campaign against the Eastern Guizhou Soviet
First encirclement campaign against the Hailufeng Soviet
First encirclement campaign against the Honghu Soviet
First encirclement campaign against the Hubei-Henan-Anhui Soviet
First encirclement campaign against the Hubei-Henan-Shaanxi Soviet
First encirclement campaign against the Jiangxi Soviet
First encirclement campaign against the Nantong-Haimen-Rugao-Taixing Soviet
First encirclement campaign against the Qiongya Soviet
First encirclement campaign against the Shaanxi-Gansu Soviet
First encirclement campaign against the Sichuan-Shaanxi Soviet
First encirclement campaign against the Southern Fujian Soviet
First encirclement campaign against the Youjiang Soviet

Second encirclement campaigns
Second encirclement campaign against the Central Fujian Soviet
Second encirclement campaign against the Eastern Guizhou Soviet
Second encirclement campaign against the Hailufeng Soviet
Second encirclement campaign against the Honghu Soviet
Second encirclement campaign against the Hubei-Henan-Anhui Soviet
Second encirclement campaign against the Hubei-Henan-Shaanxi Soviet
Second encirclement campaign against the Jiangxi Soviet
Second encirclement campaign against the Nantong-Haimen-Rugao-Taixing Soviet
Second encirclement campaign against the Qiongya Soviet
Second encirclement campaign against the Shaanxi-Gansu Soviet
Second encirclement campaign against the Sichuan-Shaanxi Soviet
Second encirclement campaign against the Southern Fujian Soviet
Second encirclement campaign against the Youjiang Soviet

Third encirclement campaigns
Third encirclement campaign against the Honghu Soviet
Third encirclement campaign against the Hubei-Henan-Anhui Soviet
Third encirclement campaign against the Hubei-Henan-Shaanxi Soviet
Third encirclement campaign against the Jiangxi Soviet
Third encirclement campaign against the Shaanxi-Gansu Soviet
Third encirclement campaign against the Sichuan-Shaanxi Soviet
Third encirclement campaign against the Youjiang Soviet

Fourth encirclement campaigns
Fourth encirclement campaign against the Hubei-Henan-Anhui Soviet
Fourth encirclement campaign against the Honghu Soviet = 2nd stage of the encirclement campaign against the Hunan-Western Hubei Soviet
Fourth encirclement campaign against the Jiangxi Soviet

Fifth encirclement campaigns
Fifth encirclement campaign against the Hubei-Henan-Anhui Soviet
Fifth encirclement campaign against the Jiangxi Soviet

Consequences
The first four Encirclement campaigns of the Chinese Nationalists military were unsuccessful.  However, with the rise of Adolf Hitler in Germany in 1933, and the subsequent close cooperation between Nazi Germany and the Republic of China, the nationalists succeeded in the final 5th campaign which led directly to the famous Long March of the Communist Red Armies.

See also
List of battles of the Chinese Civil War
National Revolutionary Army
People's Liberation Army
Chinese Red Army
History of the People's Liberation Army

References 

Campaigns of the Chinese Civil War
1930 in China
1931 in China
1932 in China
1933 in China
1934 in China